The men's 200 metres event at the 2015 European Athletics U23 Championships was held in Tallinn, Estonia, at Kadriorg Stadium on 10 and 11 July.

Medalists

Results

Final
11 July
Wind: 1.1 m/s

Semifinals
11 July

Semifinal 1
Wind: 0.0 m/s

Semifinal 2
Wind: 0.1 m/s

Heats
10 July

Heat 1
Wind: 1.2 m/s

Heat 2
Wind: -0.9 m/s

Heat 3
Wind: 0.5 m/s

Heat 4
Wind: 1.7 m/s

Participation
According to an unofficial count, 28 athletes from 20 countries participated in the event.

References

200 metres
200 metres at the European Athletics U23 Championships